Calathus fuscipes is a species of ground beetle from the Platyninae subfamily that can be found everywhere in Europe except for Andorra, Monaco, San Marino, Vatican City and various islands.

References

fuscipes
Beetles described in 1777
Endemic fauna of Italy
Beetles of Europe